The 2019 Malaysia Challenge Cup group stage featured 7 teams. The teams were drawn into one groups of four and another with three teams, and played each other home-and-away in a round-robin format. The top two teams in each group advanced to the semi finals.

The group stage will start on 5 August 2019 and concludes on 12 September 2019.

Groups

Group A

Group B

References

External links
 

2019 in Malaysian football